This article lists political parties in Guyana. 
Guyana has a two-party system, which means that there are two dominant political parties.  The main schism is not of ideology, but ethnicity; the People's Progressive Party is supported primarily by Indo-Guyanese people, while the People's National Congress is supported primarily by Afro-Guyanese people.

The political parties of Guyana

Parliamentary parties

Non-parliamentary parties
 Guyana Democratic Party
 Justice for All Party
 National Front Alliance
 The United Force
 United Republican Party

See also
 Politics of Guyana
 List of political parties by country

Footnotes

Guyana
 
Political parties
Political parties
Guyana